The Roman Catholic Diocese of Kildare and Leighlin is a Roman Catholic diocese in eastern Ireland. It is one of three suffragan dioceses in the ecclesiastical province of Dublin and is subject to the Archdiocese of Dublin. On 7 May 2013, the Most Reverend Denis Nulty was appointed Bishop of the diocese.

Geographic remit
The united diocese includes virtually all of County Carlow, most of County Kildare and parts of counties Offaly, Laois, Kilkenny, Wexford and Wicklow. The largest towns in the diocese are Carlow, Edenderry, Kildare, Naas, Newbridge, Portarlington and Portlaoise.

History
These two dioceses continued to be separate from their foundation until 1678, when, owing to the extreme tenuity of the episcopal revenues, the bishopric of Leighlin was given in commendam by the Holy See to the Bishop of Kildare. The Cathedral Church of the Assumption of the Blessed Virgin Mary is located in the town of Carlow.

Today with the help of an enthusiastic lay people the Diocese is always busy in promoting faith of the youth in the local area. a Key example of this is by its active involvement in the John Paul II Awards. The Pope John Paul II Award was created to commemorate the late Pope John Paul II who was so committed to young people and who had such belief and confidence in them. The Award was launched by the Papal Nuncio to Ireland, His Excellency Most Rev Dr Giuseppe Lazzarotto on 7 November 2006 in the Diocese of Derry, Ireland. it is dedicated to Pope John Paul II due to the strong beliefs he had in the youth of the world today.

Deaneries and parishes
The united Diocese of Kildare and Leighlin is divided into seven deaneries, each divided into a number of parishes or group parishes.

Ordinaries

The following is a basic list of the Bishops of Kildare and Leighlin.
 Edward Nolan (1834–1837)
 Francis Haly (1838–1855)
 James Walshe (1856–1888)
 James Lynch, C.M. (1888–1896)
 Patrick Foley (1897–1926)
 Matthew Cullen (1927–1936)
 Thomas Keogh (1936–1967)
 Patrick Lennon (1967–1987)
 Laurence Ryan (1987–2002)
 James Moriarty (2002–2010)
 Denis Nulty  (2013–present)

See also
 Catholic Church in Ireland
 Bishop of Leighlin
 Old Leighlin
 Diocese of Meath and Kildare (Church of Ireland)

References

 http://www.gcatholic.org/dioceses/country/IE.htm

 
Kildare
1694 establishments in Ireland
Religion in County Carlow
Religion in County Kildare
Religion in County Kilkenny
Religion in County Laois
Religion in County Offaly
Religion in County Wexford
Religion in County Wicklow
Roman Catholic Ecclesiastical Province of Dublin